Sandrine Roux (born 22 December 1966) is a French former footballer, who played for the national team between 1983 and 2000. Roux played as a goalkeeper.

Personal life
Roux was born in Montreuil, a suburb of Paris. She started playing football in 1974, during which time she had to hide her long hair under a cap. As a youngstar, she played at Paris FC, which at the time only had a men's team, under the name Stéphane, as women were not allowed to play in the men's team.

Career

She played for VGA Saint-Maur from 1980 until 1999, and won Division 1 Féminine titles with them in 1983, 1985, 1986, 1987, 1988, and 1990. She later played for Olympique Lyonnais Féminin, from 1999 until 2001.

Roux made her debut for France in 1983. She competed at the UEFA Women's Euro 1997, and played internationally until 2000. She made 71 appearances for the national team.

Roux retired from football in 2001. In the same year, she became goalkeeping coach for France U-17. She later worked as an assistant coach for France U-20 at the 2016 FIFA U-20 Women's World Cup.

In 2019, Roux worked as a commentator for the Canal+ coverage of the 2019 FIFA Women's World Cup.

References

External links
 
 

1966 births
Living people
France women's international footballers
Women's association football goalkeepers
Sportspeople from Montreuil, Seine-Saint-Denis
Olympique Lyonnais Féminin players
French women's footballers
Footballers from Seine-Saint-Denis